Major-General Sir Charlton Watson Spinks  (1877-1959) was a British Army officer who became Sirdar (Commander-in-Chief) of the Egyptian Army.

Military career
Spinks was commissioned as a second lieutenant in the Royal Artillery on 17 March 1900. He was promoted to lieutenant on 3 April 1901, and in March 1902 was seconded for service under the Colonial Office, where he was attached to the Northern Nigeria Regiment. He took part in operations in the Kano-Sokoto Campaign in 1903 and operations against the Okpotos in Bassa Province in 1904. After taking part in World War I, he became the last Sirdar of Egypt serving from 1924 to 1937. His predecessor Sir Lee Stack was assassinated while being driven through central Cairo.

Among other honours, Spinks was appointed Knight Commander of the Order of the British Empire, Grand Cordon of the Order of the Nile, Companion of the Distinguished Service Order and Grand Officer of the Order of the Crown of Italy.

Family
He was married to Marguerite Coleman of Toronto, Ontario, Canada.

References

1877 births
1959 deaths
Knights Commander of the Order of the British Empire
Companions of the Distinguished Service Order